Chun Yuan Steel Industry is a steel producer in Taiwan. It is the largest steel company in northern Taiwan. Its factories are located in New Taipei, Taichung and Kaohsiung.  Chun Yuan also invests for founding steel mills in Mainland China.

History
The company was established on 7 January 1966.

See also
 List of companies of Taiwan

References

1966 establishments in Taiwan
Manufacturing companies based in Taipei
Manufacturing companies established in 1966
Steel companies of Taiwan